Ellys is a surname. Notable people with the surname include:

 Ellys baronets
 Anthony Ellys (1690–1761), English bishop
 Thomas Ellys (disambiguation), multiple people

See also
Ellis